The AAA Americas Trios Championship was a six-man tag team title contested for in the Mexican lucha libre promotion AAA. The last recorded title defense for Los Villanos (Villano III, Villano IV and Villano V) was in 1997, no official announcement has been made but the title has quietly been eliminated at some point after 1997 when Los Villanos stopped working for AAA. Being a professional wrestling championship, it was not won legitimately: it is instead won via a scripted ending to a match or awarded to a wrestler because of a storyline.

Title history

1996 AAA American Trios Title Tournament 
The tournament ran from February 3, 1996, to March 8, 1996, to crown the first AAA American Trios champions.

References

General source for title history

Specific sources

Lucha Libre AAA Worldwide championships
Trios wrestling tag team championships
Regional professional wrestling championships